Paul and Ellen Welles House, also known as the Robert and Anne Dahle House, is a historic home located at Raleigh, Wake County, North Carolina.  It was built in 1956, and is a two-story, split level Modern Movement-style dwelling.  It has a brick-veneered lower level and a slightly cantilevered upper level sheathed with board-and-batten siding.  It features an asymmetrical side-gable roof with wide overhanging eaves.

It was listed on the National Register of Historic Places in 2009.

References

Houses on the National Register of Historic Places in North Carolina
Modernist architecture in North Carolina
Houses completed in 1956
Houses in Raleigh, North Carolina
National Register of Historic Places in Raleigh, North Carolina